Tigerbeat6 is a San Francisco and Berlin based independent and (mostly) electronic record label run by Kid606 (Miguel De Pedro). The label is run as a DIY operation and releases a variety of electronic music styles, including noisecore, intelligent dance music, bedroom pop, folktronica, and electronica-driven hip hop.
The name reflects De Pedro's obsession with cats, which also comes to light in the catalogue numbers, all of which start with MEOW. It is also a loose reference to the top-selling teen magazine Tiger Beat. The label's first release was in 2000; it has over two hundred releases in total. A 2001 compilation of the label's output was described as "stripping intelligent dance music of its intelligence[,] often resorting to outright silliness, and sometimes parody." The A.V. Club described the same compilation as satirizing glitch through "gestures borrowed from punk, indie-rock, and hip-hop."

Tigerbeat6 has four sublabels: Nibbana, Shockout, Tigerbass, and Violent Turd.

Artists 
Black Dice
Kevin Blechdom
The Bug
Cex
DAT Politics
DJ /rupture
Drop the Lime
Electric Company
Genders
Kid606
Goodiepal
Knifehandchop
J Lesser
Max Tundra
Nudge
Numbers
Sickboy
Stars as Eyes
The Soft Pink Truth
Pimmon
Quintron
White Williams

References

Further reading

External links 
 Official site
 Tigerbeat6 Discography @ Discogs.com

Record labels established in 2000
American independent record labels
Electronic music record labels